The Arab Socialist Ba'ath Party was a political party mixing Arab nationalist and Arab socialist interests, opposed to Western imperialism, and calling for the renaissance or resurrection and unification of the Arab world into a single state. Ba'ath is also spelled Ba'th or Baath and means "rebirth," "resurrection," "restoration," or "renaissance" (reddyah). Its motto — "Unity, Liberty, Socialism" (wahda, hurriya, ishtirakiya) — refers to Arab unity, and freedom from non-Arab control and interference. Its ideology of Arab socialism is notably different in origins and practice from classical Marxism and is similar in outlook to 'third-worldism'.

The party was founded in 1940 by the Syrian intellectuals Michel Aflaq and Salah al-Din al-Bitar. It has established branches in different Arab countries, although it has only ever held power in Syria and Iraq. In Syria it has had a monopoly on political power since the party's 1963 coup. Ba'athists also seized power in Iraq in 1963, but were deposed some months later. They returned to power in a 1968 coup and remained the sole party of government until the 2003 Iraq invasion. Since the invasion, the party has been banned in Iraq.

In 1966, a coup d'état by the military against the historical leadership of Aflaq and Bitar led the Syrian and Iraqi parties to split into rival organizations — the Qotri (or regionalist) Syria-based party and the Qawmi (or nationalist) Iraq-based party. Both retained the Ba'ath name and parallel structures within the Arab world, but hostilities between them grew to the point that the Syrian Ba'ath government became the only Arab government to support Iran (a non-Arabic nation) against Iraq during the First Persian Gulf War.

Major groups

Regional branches

Splinter-groups

References